The Pocket Essentials is a series of small, A6 sized books on various subjects. The publisher is also known as Pocket Essentials. Each book is written by a different author. The books have been credited with being full of rare information, though there are no pictures.

Books in the series

Film directors
 Woody Allen
 Jane Campion
 Jackie Chan
 Sergio Leone
 Billy Wilder
 Quentin Tarantino

Film genres
 Blaxploitation Films
 Horror Films
 Slasher Movies
 Vampire Films
 Carry On Films

Film subjects
 Laurel and Hardy
 Steve McQueen
 Marilyn Monroe
 Filming on a Microbudget
 Film Studios

Music
 The Madchester Scene
 How to Succeed in the Music Business
 Jethro Tull

Literature
 Cyberpunk
 Agatha Christie
 Terry Pratchett
 William Shakespeare
 Philip K. Dick
 Sherlock Holmes
 Hitchhiker's Guide
 Creative Writing
 The Beat Generation
 Noir Fiction
 The Adventures of Tintin
 Alan Moore

Ideas
 Conspiracy theories
 Feminism
 Nietzsche
 Freud and Psychoanalysis
 UFOs
 Bisexuality

History
 Alchemy & Alchemists
 Jack the Ripper
 American Civil War
 Globalisation
 The Crusades
 The Rise of New Labour
 American Indian Wars
 Who Shot JFK?
 The Black Death
 Ancient Greece
 Witchcraft

Miscellaneous
 Stock Market Essentials
 How to Succeed as a Sports Agent
 Doctor Who
 The Simpsons

External links
The Official Site

Pocket Essentials, The